Paolo Frisi (13 April 1728 – 22 November 1784) was an Italian mathematician and astronomer.

Biography

Frisi was born in Melegnano in 1728; his sibling Antonio Francesco,  born in 1735, went on to be a historian. Frisi was educated at the local Barnabite monastery and afterwards in that of Padua. When twenty-one years of age he composed a treatise on the figure of the earth, and the reputation which he soon acquired led to his appointment by the King of Sardinia to the professorship of philosophy in the College of Casale. His friendship with Radicati, a man of liberal opinions, occasioned Frisi's removal by his clerical superiors to Novara, where he was compelled to do duty as a preacher.

In 1753 he was elected a corresponding member of the Paris Academy of Sciences, and shortly afterwards he became professor of philosophy in the Barnabite College of St Alexander at Milan. An acrimonious attack by a young Jesuit, about this time, upon his dissertation on the figure of the earth laid the foundation of his animosity against the Jesuits, with whose enemies, including Jean d'Alembert, J. A. N. Condorcet and other Encyclopedists, he later closely associated himself. In 1756 he was appointed by Leopold, Grand Duke of Tuscany, to the professorship of mathematics in the university of Pisa, a post which he held for eight years. In 1756 he became an associate of the Imperial Academy of St Petersburg, and a foreign member of the Royal Society of London, and in 1758 a member of the Academy of Berlin, in 1766 of that of Stockholm, and in 1770 of the Academies of Copenhagen and of Bern. From several European crowned heads he received, at various times, marks of special distinction, and the empress Maria Theresa granted him a yearly pension of 100 sequins.

In 1764 he was created professor of mathematics in the palatine schools at Milan, and obtained from Pope Pius VI the release from ecclesiastical jurisdiction, and authority to become a secular priest. In 1766 he visited France and England, and in 1768 Vienna. His knowledge of hydraulics caused him to be frequently consulted with respect to the management of canals and other watercourses in various parts of Europe. It was through his means that lightning conductors were first introduced into Italy for the protection of buildings.

In 1766, Frisi was elected a foreign member of the Royal Swedish Academy of Sciences.

He died in Milan in 1784. There is a street named after him in Melegnano and a high school in Monza.

Works
 

 
 
 
 

Algebra e geometrica analitica (1782) 
Meccanica (1783)
Saggio della morale filosofica
Elogio di Galileo Galilei e di Bonaventura Cavalieri

See also
List of Roman Catholic scientist-clerics

References

1728 births
1784 deaths
People from Melegnano
18th-century Italian mathematicians
18th-century Italian astronomers
Members of the Royal Swedish Academy of Sciences
Fellows of the Royal Society
Catholic clergy scientists